Keshaw Prasad Chandra is an Indian politician and  has been the member of the Chhattisgarh Legislative Assembly for the constituency of Jaijaipur since 2013. He is a member of the Bahujan Samaj Party.

References

Chhattisgarh MLAs 2008–2013
Chhattisgarh MLAs 2013–2018
Bahujan Samaj Party politicians from Chhattisgarh
Living people
Year of birth missing (living people)